Wendell Adrian Mottley ORTT (born 2 July 1941) is a Trinidad and Tobago economist, politician and athlete. Mottley served as Senator and member of the House of Representatives with the Trinidad and Tobago Parliament and was Minister of Finance from 1991 to 1995. He was a Ivy League sprinter, winning two Olympic medals in 1964.

Early life and education 
Mottley was born in Port of Spain, Trinidad and Tobago. He was the youngest of four brothers who were all runners. As a youngster, he began to run in competitions sponsored local oil companies. He attended Queen's Royal College, an elite public high school in Port of Spain.  While competing in a high school track meet, the coach from Loughborough University suggested Mottley would be of interest to his friend who coached track at Yale University.

Mottley attended Yale University, graduating in economics in 1964. While at Yale, he made the dean's list, was captain of the track team, and joined St. Anthony Hall. He was the first person of color to join St. Anthony Hall, nationwide.

He earned a masters in economics from the University of Cambridge. While at Cambridge, Mottley was captain of the track team and became lifelong friends the Oxford team's captain, later the novelist Jeffrey Archer.

Athletics 
Mottley was a sprinter for Yale University track team. His coach was Bob Giegengack, also the  track coach for Team USA in the 1964 Summer Olympics. In addition to sprinting, Giegengack had Mottley run cross country, "which he hated."

Mottley participated in three Heptagonal Games Championships between 1962–1964, winning the 440y each year. In the mid 1960s, Mottley was the fastest man in Yale University and Ivy League history. He still is the record holder in the 500m/600y at Yale. Mottley also set indoor world records for the 400-yard, 500-yard, and 600-yard distances in 1964. His personal best time of 45.2 stands as the Ivy League record for the 440y/400 meter event.. One writer notes, "In his time he was not only the best long sprinter in the Ivy League but also one of the best in the world." In 1964 he set indoor world records for the 400-yard, 500-yard, and 600-yard distances.

At the 1964 Summer Olympics in Tokyo, Mottley won a silver medal for the 400 meters and a bronze medal for the 4 x 400 meters relay, representing Trinidad and Tobago. After the race where he won the silver medal, Mottley says Giegengack gave him a salute.

After the Olympics, he ran track for Cambridge University and competed in the European circuit. He also took two gold medals at the 1966 British Empire and Commonwealth Games in Jamaica, winning in the 440 yards and the 4×440 yards relay events. The relay team set the Commonwealth Games record for the 4x440y.

Career

Politics 
Mottley was elected as Senator to the Trinidad and Tobago 2nd Republican Parliament from 1981–1986, and was appointed  Minister of Housing and Resettlement from 1981–1985. He was then appointed Minister of Industry and Commerce, serving from 1985–1986.

As a member of the People's National Party, he was elected to the House of Representatives for the 4th Republication Parliament from 1992–1995. From 1992–1994, he was Minister of Finance. He was responsible for the flotation of the Trinidad and Tobago dollar. He also founded the Civilian Conservation Corps in Trinidad and Tobago.He was Minister of Tourism from 1994–1995.

In the early 2000s, Mottley was the leader of the Citizens' Alliance, a dissolved minor political party in Trinidad and Tobago. His party received 5,955 votes (1%) and captured no seats in the 2002 general election.

Career 
After Cambridge, Mottley worked in London, before returning to Trinidad and Tobago where he developed a career in housing development. In 1996, Mottley became an investment banker at Credit Suisse in New York, serving as managing director and senior advisor over the course of fifteen years.

Mottley was a visiting fellow at the Center for Global Development, a United States-based think tank, where he contributed Trinidad and Tobago--industrial policy 1959–2008 : a Historical and Contemporary Analysis in 2008.

Later, he was chairman of the board of the Unit Trust Corporation, the Caribbean's largest mutual fund company.

He serves on the board of the Pan-American Life Insurance Group from 2013 to his retirement in 2021. He had reached the board's mandatory retirement ago of eighty.

Affiliations 
Mottey served on the board of World Wildlife Fund and the  Asa Wright Beard Foundation, a Caribbean environmentalist group. He is also a member of the Yale School of Forestry  leadership council.

Honours
On November 1, 2018, Mottley received the Order of the Republic of Trinidad and Tobago (ORTT) for his contribution to national development and public service.

References

External links
 sports-reference

1941 births
Living people
Alumni of Queen's Royal College, Trinidad
Athletes (track and field) at the 1964 Summer Olympics
Athletes (track and field) at the 1966 British Empire and Commonwealth Games
Commonwealth Games gold medallists for Trinidad and Tobago
Commonwealth Games medallists in athletics
Credit Suisse people
Finance ministers of Trinidad and Tobago
Government ministers of Trinidad and Tobago
Medalists at the 1964 Summer Olympics
Olympic athletes of Trinidad and Tobago
Olympic bronze medalists for Trinidad and Tobago
Olympic bronze medalists in athletics (track and field)
Olympic silver medalists for Trinidad and Tobago
Olympic silver medalists in athletics (track and field)
Sportspeople from Port of Spain
Trinidad and Tobago male sprinters
Trinidad and Tobago sportsperson-politicians
Yale Bulldogs men's track and field athletes
Members of the House of Representatives (Trinidad and Tobago)
Members of the Senate (Trinidad and Tobago)
Yale University alumni
Alumni of the University of Cambridge
People from Port of Spain
Medallists at the 1966 British Empire and Commonwealth Games